White Oak is a 1921 American silent Western film directed by Lambert Hillyer and written by William S. Hart and Bennet Musson. The film stars William S. Hart, Vola Vale, Alexander Gaden, Robert D. Walker, Bert Sprotte, Helen Holly, and Luther Standing Bear. The film was released on December 18, 1921, by Paramount Pictures. A copy of the film is in the Library of Congress, Museum of Modern Art, and William S. Hart Museum film archives.

Cast 
 William S. Hart as Oak Miller
 Vola Vale as Barbara
 Alexander Gaden as Mark Granger
 Robert D. Walker as Barbara's brother
 Bert Sprotte as Eliphalet Moss
 Helen Holly as Rose Miller
 Luther Standing Bear as Chief Long Knife

References

External links 

 
 
 Film stills and poster at silenthollywood.com

1921 films
1921 Western (genre) films
Paramount Pictures films
Films directed by Lambert Hillyer
American black-and-white films
Silent American Western (genre) films
1920s English-language films
1920s American films